Epimactis atropunctella is a moth in the family Lecithoceridae. It was described by Walsingham in 1881. It is found in Mozambique, South Africa (KwaZulu-Natal) and Zimbabwe.

The wingspan is about 15 mm. The forewings are white, the costa very narrowly tinged with straw-colour, especially towards the apex. There are two black discal spots before the middle, the upper one being the nearest to the base, a third black spot lying at the end of the cell. A row of three to five smaller black dots is found along the apical margin. The hindwings are rather shining whitish, with a very faint rosy greyish tinge.

References

Moths described in 1881
Epimactis